Missouri generally has a variety of seasonal humid subtropical climate (Köppen climate classification Cfa), with cool winters and long, hot summers. In the southern part of the state, particularly in the Bootheel, the climate borders on a more mild-type humid subtropical climate (Köppen Cfa), and in the northern third, the state transitions into a humid continental climate (Köppen Dfa). Because of its location in the interior United States, Missouri often experiences extremes in temperatures. Lacking either large mountains or oceans nearby to moderate its temperature, its climate is alternately influenced by air from the cold Arctic and the hot and humid Gulf of Mexico.

Overview 

While the adjacent table would suggest a very mild climate, a temperature fluctuation of 20 degrees Fahrenheit on average and 30 to 40 degrees Fahrenheit (17 to 22 degrees Celsius) in a twenty-four-hour period is common. Although the mean temperature for June and July is only 73 °F and 76 °F (23 °C and 24 °C) it is not uncommon for the temperature to reach 100 °F (38 °C) at least three concurrent days each week in these months, as it did in 1904 during the World Fair where the temperature in St. Louis, Missouri was 103 °F (39 °C).

Statistics for selected cities

Spring
Spring is generally the wettest season of the year, with the mean temperature from 1895 until 2003 being about 12 °C (54 °F) and its mean precipitation (in the form of rain) for this period being approximately 300 mm (12 inches). April through June is generally the wettest period. The spring also produces the most tornadoes, with an average of 35 tornadoes each year.

Summer 
Summer, June through August, is the hottest time of the year with a mean temperature of 24 °C (75 °F) and a mean precipitation of 300 mm (12 inches) with June having more precipitation than either July or August. The extreme highs for the year often occur in July or August.  Tropical cyclones and their remains can impact the state during this time of the year, contributing to area rainfall.

Autumn 
Fall, September through November, has less and less precipitation towards the end of the season. The mean temperatures for this season are 13.6 °C (56.5 °F) and the mean precipitation is 250mm (10 in).  Tropical cyclones and their remains can impact the state into October, contributing to area rainfall.

Winter 

Winters in Missouri can be long with temperatures ranging from mildly to bitterly cold. Winter also tends to be the driest season, but typically yields significant amounts of winter precipitation. During the winter, northwest winds prevail; the air movement is largely from the south and southeast during the rest of the year.

See also 
 Climate
 Climate change in Missouri
 Climatology
 List of wettest known tropical cyclones, and their remnants, across Missouri
 St. Louis tornado history

Notes

References 

 
Missouri